Ottar Fjærvoll (9 April 1914 - 28 September 1995) was a Norwegian politician from the Centre Party.

He was appointed State Secretary in the Ministry of Fisheries from 1966 to 1968, during the cabinet Borten. He served as a deputy representative in the Norwegian Parliament from Hordaland during the term 1954–1957.

References
 

1914 births
1995 deaths
Norwegian state secretaries
Deputy members of the Storting
Centre Party (Norway) politicians
Hordaland politicians